Norman W. Schur (1907–1992) was an American lawyer and lexicographer. Schur was born in Boston, Massachusetts, graduating from Boston Latin School before he learned Greek, French, German, Latin and Italian, and graduated from Harvard University in 1927. He spent a year on a fellowship in Italy and France before returning to spend a year at Harvard Law School (before transferring to Columbia). After graduating from law school at Columbia, Schur practiced law in both the United States and United Kingdom for over 50 years before turning his attention to his lifelong love of words and authoring several lexicons.

Bibliography of his works 
 British Self-Taught: With Comments in American (1973) Macmillan. 
 English English: A Descriptive Dictionary (1978) Verbatim Books. 
 1000 Most Important Words (1981) Ballantine Books. 
 Practical English: 1000 Most Effective Words (1983) Ballantine Books. 
 1000 Most Practical Words (1983) Facts On File. 
 1000 Most Challenging Words (1988) Facts On File. 
 1000 Most Obscure Words (1990) Facts On File. 
 British English A to Zed (1991) Harper Perennial. 
 The Facts on File student's thesaurus (1991) Facts On File. 
 2000 Most Challenging and Obscure Words (1994) Galahad Books. 
 British English A to Zed, revised by Eugene Ehrlich (2001) Facts on File.

References 

British lexicographers
20th-century British lawyers
1907 births
1992 deaths
20th-century  American lawyers
20th-century lexicographers
Harvard College alumni
Columbia Law School alumni
Harvard Law School alumni